Intorno alla mia cattiva educazione is the first and only studio album by the Italian progressive rock band Alusa Fallax. It was released in 1974.

Track listing
Soliloquio - 3:02
Non Fatemi Caso - 4:22
Intorno Alla Mia Cattiva Educazione - 4:14
Fuori di Me, Dentro di Me - 3:01
Riflessioni al Tramonto - 3:04
Il Peso delle Tradizioni - 1:40
Carta Carbone - 3:33
Perché Ho Venduto il Mio Sangue - 1:43
Per Iniziare una Vita - 4:20
È Oggi - 2:51
È Così Poco Quel Che Conosco - 2:55
Ciò Che Nasce Con Me - 4:11
Splendida Sensazione - 5:43

Personnel
 Guido Gabet: guitar
 Massimino Paretti: keyboards
 Mario Cirla: saxophone, flute
 Guido Cirla: bass
 Duty Cirla: percussion, vocals

Release information
 LP Fonit - LPQ 09082 (1974)
 CD Mellow Records - MMP 229 (1994)
 CD BTF/Vinyl Magic VMCD 103 (2005)

Notes

1974 albums